Rahmatabad (also Romanized as Raḩmatābād and Rehmatābād; also known as Raḩmatābād-e Khodābandeh) is a village in Howmeh Rural District, in the Central District of Khodabandeh County, Zanjan Province, Iran. At the 2006 census, its population was 244, in 48 families.

References 

Populated places in Khodabandeh County